Tierre Brown (born June 3, 1979) is an American former professional basketball player.

Career
Brown graduated from McNeese State University and began his career with the NBA's Houston Rockets in 2001. He played fifteen games for the Cleveland Cavaliers in 2002–03, and three games for the New Orleans Hornets for the 2003–04 season. Brown would spend the 2004-05 NBA season with the Los Angeles Lakers, and played in most of their contests that year. He was named the MVP of the NBA Development League in 2004.
His stint with the Raptors was short lived as he was cut on October 22, joining the NBA Development League's Albuquerque Thunderbirds in January 2006. Led The Team To The NBDL Championship. He then switched to Europe, playing with Italy's Basket Napoli, agreeing to part ways in February 2007.

Brown played a total of 134 games in his NBA career and holds averages of 3.9 points, 1.2 rebounds, and 2 assists per game. His final NBA game was on April 11, 2005 in a 97 - 108 loss to the Phoenix Suns  where Brown recorded 8 points, 2 steals, 1 rebound and 1 assist.

On November 7, 2008, Brown was selected with the 9th pick in the first round of the 2008 NBA Development League Draft by the Anaheim Arsenal.

On February 27, 2015, Brown signed with Gaiteros del Zulia of Venezuela.

References

External links
NBA.com profile
Eurobasket.com profile
Stats at databaseBasketball.com
Career moves at hoopshype.com

1979 births
Living people
African-American basketball players
Albuquerque Thunderbirds players
American expatriate basketball people in Belarus
American expatriate basketball people in Italy
American expatriate basketball people in Qatar
American expatriate basketball people in Venezuela
American men's basketball players
Basket Napoli players
Basketball players from Louisiana
BC Tsmoki-Minsk players
Charleston Lowgators players
Cleveland Cavaliers players
Gaiteros del Zulia players
Houston Rockets players
Idaho Stampede players
Los Angeles Lakers players
McNeese Cowboys basketball players
New Orleans Hornets players
Pallacanestro Varese players
People from Iowa, Louisiana
Point guards
Undrafted National Basketball Association players
21st-century African-American sportspeople
20th-century African-American sportspeople